John Passmore Widgery, Baron Widgery,  (24 July 1911 – 26 July 1981) was an English judge who served as Lord Chief Justice of England and Wales from 1971 to 1980. He is principally noted for presiding over the  Widgery Tribunal on the events of Bloody Sunday.

Early career and war service
Widgery came from a North Devon family which had been living in South Molton for many generations. His father, Samuel Widgery (died 1940), was a house furnisher; his mother Bertha Elizabeth, née Passmore, was Samuel's second wife, and served as a magistrate. An ancestor had been a gaoler. Widgery attended Queen's College, Taunton, where he became head prefect.

He was admitted as a solicitor in 1933 after serving as an articled clerk, but instead of going into practice, he joined Gibson and Welldon, a well-known firm of law tutors. He was an effective lecturer in the years leading up to World War II while he was also commissioned into the Royal Engineers (Territorial Army) in 1938, having joined as a sapper. As a searchlight officer, in 1940 he transferred to the Royal Artillery. Widgery participated in the Normandy landings. By the end of the war he had an OBE, the Croix de Guerre (France), and the Order of Leopold (Belgium), and had reached the rank of brigadier. Widgery was an active freemason.

Barrister
After demobilization Widgery changed to another branch of the legal profession as he was called to the bar by Lincoln's Inn in 1946. He gathered a reputation for being a fast talker, and eventually came to specialise in disputes over rating and town planning, where his methodical approach and self-control were useful attributes. In 1958 he was made a Queen's Counsel, the first such award given to a post-war barrister.

Widgery became a High Court judge in 1961, receiving the customary knighthood. As a judge he did not draw attention to himself and his judgments tended not to include any comments which were pithy, memorable or quotable. However, his calmness produced judgments which were generally regarded as fair and humane. One example cited in the Oxford Dictionary of National Biography was his justification for limiting damages for economic loss in Weller v Foot and Mouth Disease Research Institute, a judgment handed down in 1966. Widgery headed several inquiries during his term.

Appellate courts
He received promotion to the Court of Appeal in 1968, but had barely got used to his new position when Lord Parker of Waddington (who had been Lord Chief Justice since 1958) announced his retirement. There was no obvious successor and Widgery was the most junior of the possible appointees. The Lord Chancellor, Lord Hailsham, chose Widgery largely on the basis of his administrative abilities. On 20 April 1971 he was created a life peer taking the title Baron Widgery, of South Molton in the County of Devon.

Widgery Tribunal

Shortly after assuming office, Widgery was handed the politically sensitive job of conducting an inquiry into the events of 30 January 1972 in Derry, where soldiers from Parachute Regiment had shot and killed 13 civil rights marchers, an event commonly referred to as Bloody Sunday (a 14th person died shortly after Widgery's appointment). Widgery heard testimony from the soldiers, who claimed they had been shot at, while the marchers insisted that no one from the march was armed. Widgery produced a report, published in April 1972 that took the side of the soldiers. Widgery put the main blame for the deaths on the march organisers for creating a dangerous situation where a confrontation was inevitable. His strongest criticism of the soldiers was that their "firing bordered on the reckless".

The Widgery Report was accepted by the British government but met with a mixed reception in Northern Ireland; loyalists supported the report but Irish republicans, particularly those from the Bogside and Creggan areas, criticised Widgery's findings. The British government had acquired a level of goodwill in Northern Ireland due to its suspension of the Stormont Parliament, but that was said to have disappeared when Widgery's conclusions were published. Grievances with Widgery's findings in Northern Ireland lingered and the report remained contentious as the Northern Ireland peace process advanced in the 1990s.

In January 1998, on the eve of the 26th anniversary of Bloody Sunday, British Prime Minister Tony Blair announced a new inquiry, criticising the rushed process in which Widgery failed to take evidence from those wounded on Bloody Sunday and did not personally read eyewitness accounts. The resulting Bloody Sunday Inquiry lasted 12 years before the Saville Report was published on 15 June 2010. It overturned the findings of the Widgery Report, finding that soldiers present on Bloody Sunday had lied about their actions and had falsely claimed to have been attacked. The Daily Telegraph described the  Saville Report as "[turning] the Widgery report on its head by exonerating the victims and delivering a damning account of the conduct of soldiers." The inquiry led British Prime Minister David Cameron, on behalf of the United Kingdom, to formally apologise for the "unjustified and unjustifiable" events of Bloody Sunday in 2010.

Lord Chief Justice
Widgery ruled in the case R v Commissioner of Metropolitan Police, ex parte Blackburn on the duty of the Crown to prosecute.  The case was described as follows: "A and B are alleged to have committed a crime. A is charged with the crime, convicted and sentenced. B is not charged. At the trial of A there is evidence which suggests that B may have committed or been a participant to the crime. Can the prosecution be compelled to prosecute B?"  In 1968, the Court of Queen's Bench of Widgery, Melford Stevenson and Daniel Brabin issued judgment that "to prosecute must indisputably be a matter of discretion", which was affirmed by the Court of Appeal.

Widgery also ruled on the Crossman diaries case when the government attempted to suppress the publication on the grounds of confidentiality. He made it clear during the case that he felt Crossman had "broken the rules," but ultimately refused to grant an injunction preventing publication. In criminal cases, Widgery became concerned by an increasing number of cases resting on weak identification evidence. He declared in 1974 that misidentification was "the most serious chink in our armour when we say British justice is the best in the world." In March 1976 Widgery dismissed the first appeal by the Birmingham Six in respect of the Birmingham pub bombings.

Personal life
In 1948, Widgery married Ann, daughter of William Edwin Kermode, of Peel, Isle of Man.

Later years and death
His later years in office were marred by persistent ill health and mental decline. In Private Eye it was claimed that "he sits hunched and scowling, squinting into his books from a range of three inches, his wig awry. He keeps up a muttered commentary of bad-tempered and irrelevant questions – 'What d'you say?', 'Speak up', 'Don't shout', 'Whipper-snapper', etc.". He resisted attempts to get him to resign until the last moment, in 1980. For at least 18 months previously he had not been in control of either his administrative work or his legal pronouncements, he would fall asleep in court, and it soon became apparent that he was suffering from dementia. He died two days after his 70th birthday, in 1981.

In Jimmy McGovern's 2002 film Sunday, which portrayed the events of Bloody Sunday and subsequent inquiry, Widgery was portrayed by Michael Byrne.

Arms

References

External links
 Saville Inquiry, full text, and all submissions

1911 births
1981 deaths
People from South Molton
20th-century English judges
Lord chief justices of England and Wales
People educated at Queen's College, Taunton
Royal Engineers officers
Royal Artillery officers
Royal Engineers soldiers
Crossbench life peers
British Army personnel of World War II
Queen's Bench Division judges
Freemasons of the United Grand Lodge of England

Officers of the Order of the British Empire

Recipients of the Croix de Guerre 1939–1945 (France)
Knights Bachelor
Members of the Privy Council of the United Kingdom
English King's Counsel
20th-century King's Counsel
Life peers created by Elizabeth II
British Army brigadiers
Military personnel from Devon